Constituencies in 1974–1983 | 1983 MPs | 1987 MPs | 1992 MPs | Constituencies in 1997–present

This is a list of all constituencies that were in existence in the 1983 and 1987 General Elections broken down by region. Apart from one seat, the same seats were used in the 1992 General Election.

South East of England (77 then 78)

Berkshire (7)

Buckinghamshire (6 then 7)

East Sussex (8)

Hampshire (15)

Isle of Wight (1)

Kent (16)

Oxfordshire (6)

Surrey (11)

West Sussex (7)

South West of England (48)

Avon (10)

Cornwall (5)

Devon (11)

Dorset (7)

Gloucestershire (5)

Somerset (5)

Wiltshire (5)

Greater London (84)

North West London (23)
The boroughs of Hillingdon, Harrow, Brent, Ealing, Barnet, Camden, Hammersmith & Fulham, Kensington & Chelsea and Westminster, and the City of London.

North East London (25)
The boroughs of Enfield, Haringey, Islington, Hackney, Tower Hamlets, Newham, Waltham Forest, Redbridge, Barking & Dagenham and Havering.

South West London (17)
The boroughs of Hounslow, Richmond, Kingston, Wandsworth, Merton, Sutton and Croydon.

South East London (19)
The boroughs of Lambeth, Southwark, Lewisham, Bromley, Greenwich and Bexley.

Eastern England (51)

Bedfordshire (5)

Cambridgeshire (6)

Essex (16)

Hertfordshire (10)

Norfolk (8)

Suffolk (6)

West Midlands (58)

Hereford and Worcester (7)

Shropshire (4)

Staffordshire (11)

Warwickshire (5)

West Midlands (31)

East Midlands (42)

Derbyshire (10)

Leicestershire (9)

Lincolnshire (6)

Northamptonshire (6)

Nottinghamshire (11)

North East of England (30)

Cleveland (6)

Durham (7)

Northumberland (4)

Tyne and Wear (13)

North West of England (79)

Cheshire (10)

Cumbria (6)

Greater Manchester (30)

Lancashire (16)

Merseyside (17)

Yorkshire and Humberside (54)

Humberside (9)

North Yorkshire (7)

South Yorkshire (15)

West Yorkshire (23)

Scotland (72)

Borders (2)

Dumfries and Galloway (2)

Strathclyde (33)

Lothian (10)

Central (4)

Fife (5)

Tayside (5)

Grampian (6)

Highland (5)

Wales (38)

Gwynedd (4)

Clwyd (5)

Dyfed (4)

Powys (2)

West Glamorgan (5)

Mid Glamorgan (6)

South Glamorgan (5)

Gwent (7)

Northern Ireland (17)

See also 

1983
Parliamentary constituencies
Parliamentary constituencies
1992 United Kingdom general election
1983 in British politics
1987 in British politics
1992 in British politics
1997 in British politics